James Creighton, Jr. (April 15, 1841 – October 18, 1862) was an American baseball player during the game's amateur era, and is considered by historians to be the sport's first superstar and one of its earliest paid competitors. In 1860 and 1862 he played for one of the most dominant teams of the era, the Excelsior of Brooklyn. He also was reputed to be a superb cricketer, and played in many amateur and professional cricket matches.

During this early, pre-professional period of baseball's evolution, Creighton's pitching technique changed the sport from a game that showcased hitting, running, and fielding into a confrontation between the pitcher and batter. Under rules of the day, a pitcher was required to deliver the ball in an underhand motion with a stiff arm/stiff wrist movement. The intention was to induce the batter to swing and put the ball in play, thus initiating action on the diamond. Creighton's swift delivery was difficult for opposing batters to hit, because they were accustomed to balls being lobbed over the plate. 

The speed with which Creighton was able to hurl the ball had previously been considered impossible without movement of the elbow or wrist, which was prohibited by existing rules. If there were any such movements by Creighton, they were imperceptible. Nonetheless, he was accused by some opponents and spectators of using an illegal delivery. In effect, because Creighton was exceptionally successful, his opponents assumed he was cheating.

However, the competitive advantage of this delivery, and his success as a pitcher, eventually led others to emulate his technique. Historian Thomas Gilbert, in his 2015 book Playing First: Early Baseball Lives at Brooklyn's Green-Wood Cemetery, which includes a chapter on Creighton and his extended family, referred to Creighton's pitching style as "weaponizing the ball."

In October 1862, at the height of his popularity, Creighton suffered a ruptured abdominal hernia, a condition possibly caused and exacerbated by his unorthodox pitching motion and high per-game pitch counts. The rupture caused internal bleeding, and Creighton died four days later.

Early life
Creighton was born on April 15, 1841 in Manhattan to James and Jane Creighton, and was raised in Brooklyn. By age 16, he had become recognized in the Brooklyn area for his batting skills in both baseball and cricket. In 1857, along with other neighborhood youths, he formed a local baseball club named Young America. During this period, there were no organized leagues and few competing teams, so amateur clubs spent much of their time practicing and playing intra-squad games, with occasional matches against rivals. Young America played a few match games before disbanding. Creighton then became a member of Niagara of Brooklyn, playing second base.

Baseball

Discovery by the Star Club
In a match on July 19, 1859, the Niagaras were being heavily outscored by the Star Club of Brooklyn. Creighton, who had thus far been used by the team primarily in the infield, was brought on as a substitute pitcher. Using what observers described as a "low, swift delivery," Creighton achieved uncommonly swift velocity. With the balls "rising from the ground past the shoulder to the catcher," the Star batsmen were unable to hit them effectively. Under the rules of baseball at the time, a pitcher was required to deliver the ball underhanded with arm locked straight at the elbow and at the wrist. Another technique he used was to give the baseball spinning motion, making it harder for the batters to hit it squarely. Additionally, he threw a high-arcing slower pitch called a "dew-drop." It was the job of the pitcher to make it easy for the batter to hit the ball as fielding was considered the game's true skill. Star batsmen claimed that Creighton was using an illegal snap of the wrist to deliver the pitch. The Star Club eventually won the game, but following the match, Creighton left the Niagaras and joined the Stars.

Joins the Excelsiors

Before the 1860 season began, Creighton left the Star Club and joined one of the highest-profiled clubs in the game at the time, the Excelsior of Brooklyn. With their new star pitcher, the Excelsiors became a national sensation. They organized the first known baseball tour outside of their home region, taking on teams along the East Coast of the United States. That first season, Creighton scored 47 runs in 20 match games, and was retired just 56 times and did not strike out. In a game against the St. George Cricket Club on November 8, he recorded baseball's first shutout. In addition to his pitching skills, he became the game's best batter. In 1862, he batted 1.000, getting hits in all 65 of his at-bats. (The Excelsiors did not play in 1861, as many players had left to fight in the Civil War.)

Pitching style
When observing Creighton bowling in a cricket match, English cricketer John Lillywhite commented, "Why, that man is not bowling, he is throwing underhand. It is the best disguised underhand throwing I ever saw, and might readily be taken for a fair delivery." Another observer said that his pitch was "as swift as [if] it was shot out of [a] cannon." Exclesior teammate John (a.k.a. "Jack") Chapman later in his life wrote that Creighton "...had wonderful speed, and, with it, splendid command. He was fairly unhittable." Others, especially more tradition-minded members in the baseball community, complained that not only were his pitches illegal, but also unsportsmanlike. After Creighton held the famed rival Brooklyn Atlantics to five runs, an extraordinarily low total for the era, the Brooklyn Eagle dispatched a reporter to determine whether or not his pitch was legal. The journalistic witness reported that Creighton was throwing a "fair square pitch", rather than a "jerk" or an "underhand throw."

Professionalism

During this era of baseball, the game was an amateur sport, and clubs served as social organizations with sporting activities rather than as strictly sports alliances. Creighton was described as principled, unassuming, and gentlemanly — traits considered ideal during the amateur era. However, rumors circulated that clubs had started paying exceptional players in an under-the-table manner. Clubs would hire the player ostensibly for a position of responsibility within their administration, or the player would be given a sinecure in a municipal department, with the understanding that there were no actual duties required beyond playing for the sports team. 

In 1860, the Excelsior Club lured Creighton, along with teammates George Flanley and the brothers Asa and Henry Brainard. All but Henry Brainard were quietly paid a salary, with Creighton earning $500, thus making these men some of the earliest "professional" baseball players. After winning the National Association championship in 1860, Creighton and Asa Brainard jumped from the Excelsior Club to the Atlantic Club of Brooklyn. This move lasted only three weeks, and without having played any games, both players returned to the Excelsiors. While the practice of pay-for-play unofficially spread throughout baseball in the coming years, open professionalism didn't begin until the 1869 season, when the Cincinnati Red Stockings paid a salary to each member of the team.

Cricket
Creighton was considered a prominent member of the cricket community, playing both amateur and professional. He performed for the American Cricket Club in both 1861 and 1862, often playing against the all-England team, whether at Hoboken's Elysian Fields or elsewhere. Though the English teams would dominate these matches, Creighton fared well. In an 1859 match of 11 Englishmen against 16 Americans, he clean bowled five wickets out of six successive balls.

Death

There has been some historical controversy about the circumstances of Creighton's death. On October 14, 1862, Creighton played second base in a match on the Excelsior Grounds against the Union of Morrisania club, while Brainard pitched. Creighton had allegedly hit four doubles in four at bats during the first five innings. As chronicled 50 years later by a witness to the game, Jack Chapman, Creighton took over pitching duties from Brainard in the sixth inning, and in his next at bat hit a home run. While swinging the bat, he allegedly suffered an injury in his abdominal area. According to Chapman, when Creighton crossed home plate, he commented to the next batter, George Flanley, that he heard something snap. After the game, he began to experience severe pain and hemorrhaging in his abdomen. He died in his father's home on October 18 at the age of 21. In an 1887 issue of an early sports newspaper, the Sporting Life, a letter-writer, who signed only as "Old Timer", sent in his account of the event.  This account reported it as a ruptured bladder; in the light of modern medical understanding, the injury was most likely a ruptured inguinal hernia.

However, subsequent research indicates that Creighton's death by hitting a home run was fabricated years later to dramatize his martyrdom. “Dying while hitting a long home run is a great story; it’s just not true,” said Tom Shieber, senior curator of the National Baseball Hall of Fame. Shieber researched original news sources and found no references to Creighton hitting a home run in that game. The death-by-home-run myth was popularized, and probably started, five decades later by Chapman. Alfred H. Spink’s 1910 book The National Game quoted Chapman as saying, “I was present at the game between the Excelsiors and the Unions [sic] of Morrisiana at which Jim Creighton injured himself. He did it in hitting out a home run. When he had crossed the rubber [i.e., home plate] he turned to George Flanley and said, ‘I must have snapped my belt.’” Countless historians have refuted this legend, but it has taken root as factual. 

Later research has suggested that Creighton's hernia was chronic, and that the tremendous workload from baseball and cricket contributed to worsening the hernia. In that era, balls and strikes were not called, and batters who couldn't hit Creighton's rapid deliveries adapted by refusing to swing at good pitches, forcing Creighton to throw well over 300 pitches per match. Pitching with great force and the exaggerated body contortions necessary to achieve high velocity exacerbated his condition.

Creighton's death caused concern in the sports world that public perceptions of baseball and cricket would focus on the inherent dangers of their play, hurting the sports' popularity. Though it is generally accepted that Creighton fatally injured himself while playing baseball, it was reported that the Excelsior president, Dr. Joseph Jones, made comments during the National Association convention of 1862 that constituted an attempt to "correct" this notion. He claimed that Creighton had suffered the injury, instead, while playing cricket in a match on October 7. Later research claims that Dr. Jones' assertions are correct; Creighton had died of a "strangulated intestine", and did not hit a home run during his final game. Dr. Jones' remarks have been interpreted as his attempt to save baseball's image, and its nearly equal standing with cricket, as well as his team's legacy after losing their best player. Baseball at the time was constantly "looking forward", and Creighton's death provided the sport with a certain mythology and much-needed nostalgia. 

Creighton was buried in Brooklyn's Green-Wood Cemetery. His gravesite was marked by a 12-foot marble obelisk crowned with a large marble baseball.

Legacy

Baseball writer John Thorn commented in his book, Baseball in the Garden of Eden: The Secret History of the Early Game, that Creighton "was baseball's first hero, and I believe, the most important player not inducted into the Baseball Hall of Fame."

At the time, the sport of cricket was the most popular team sport in the United States, but Creighton and the Excelsiors had brought considerable attention to baseball. Creighton's popularity grew substantially after his death. In the following decade, teams began honoring him by naming themselves after him, and others paid tribute by visiting his gravesite. As long as twenty years later, though the public adored their star pitchers, comparisons to Creighton would inevitably emerge. It was not considered controversial to compliment a pitcher with the caveat that he "warn't no Creighton." For years following his death, the Excelsiors' program included a portrait of their team with Creighton, shrouded in black, featured prominently in the center.

Creighton's indirect legacy is perhaps most profoundly seen in what is now considered a fundamental component of the game: the called ball and the walk.  Neither existed during Creighton's lifetime, but his many imitators, who pitched with Creighton's velocity but not his control, prompted batters to stand at the plate without swinging for lengthy intervals, waiting for a pitch within reach.  Consequently, the sport's then-governing body, the National Association of Base Ball Players, introduced a rule for the 1864 season which penalized pitchers who repeatedly failed to deliver "good balls:" the called ball, three of which gave the batter a free pass to first base. 

Many think that the rule in reference to pitching will greatly promote the attractiveness of the game... The time will come when slow, twisting balls, pitched with skill and judgment, will supersede the rifle-shooter of would-be Creightons. The fast pitching system is “played out”. Spectators have become disgusted with waiting hour after hour to see three or four innings played, the pitcher and catcher tired from over-work, the batsman annoyed and irritated from waiting for good balls, the fieldsmen idle and cross for want of something to do, and all the “vim” and spirit of the game being lost, because “we want to show ‘em what a bully swift pitcher we’ve got”.These new rules, in this respect, practically take the most effective part of swift pitching out of the hands of pitchers; for, to tell the truth, not a solitary instance of fair pitching, that was very swift, have we seen since Creighton died.Posthumous postscripts

The 12-foot marble obelisk marking Creighton's grave at Green-Wood was originally crowned with a large marble baseball. However, the finial went missing and was presumed stolen in the late 19th or early 20th century. In 2014, after a successful funding campaign to restore the monument, a replica of the original finial was installed and unveiled during a public ceremony.Helsel, Phil, "Historians Restore Grave of a Pioneering Brooklyn Baseball Pitcher," Wall Street Journal, April 16, 2014

Only two photographs of Creighton are known to exist, one of him posing as a pitcher, the other as a member of the Brooklyn Excelsiors.

The television series The Simpsons'' made reference to Creighton in the Season 3 episode "Homer at the Bat", where Mr. Burns has him pegged as the right fielder for his company's softball team. His assistant Smithers has to point out that all the players Mr. Burns had selected are long dead, making reference in particular to Creighton by saying "In fact, your right fielder has been dead for 130 years."

Notes

References

Bibliography

External links

 
 https://www.youtube.com/watch?v=IRD5lIyu9UA

1841 births
1862 deaths
19th-century baseball players
Baseball deaths
Brooklyn Stars players
Brooklyn Excelsiors players
Burials at Green-Wood Cemetery
Sports deaths in New York (state)
Sportspeople from Manhattan
Baseball players from New York City
Deaths from hernias
Deaths from bleeding